Ivan Buljubašić (born 31 October 1987) is a Croatian water polo player. At the 2012 Summer Olympics, he competed for the gold medal-winning Croatian men's national water polo team in the men's event.

At club level, Buljubašić plays for Greek powerhouse Olympiacos.

Honours

Club
Jardan Herceg Novi
Montenegrin Cup: 2006–07
 Mladost
Croatian Championship: 2007–08
Croatian Cup: 2010–11
Primorje Rijeka
 LEN Champions League runners-up: 2011–12, 2014–15 
Croatian Championship: 2013–14, 2014–15
Croatian Cup: 2012–13, 2013–14, 2014–15 
 Adriatic League: 2012–13, 2013–14, 2014–15
Olympiacos 
Greek Championship: 2019–20
Greek Cup: 2019–20
Greek Super Cup: 2019

See also
 Croatia men's Olympic water polo team records and statistics
 List of Olympic champions in men's water polo
 List of Olympic medalists in water polo (men)
 List of world champions in men's water polo
 List of World Aquatics Championships medalists in water polo

References

External links
 

1987 births
Living people
Sportspeople from Makarska
Croatian male water polo players
Water polo centre backs
Water polo players at the 2012 Summer Olympics
Medalists at the 2012 Summer Olympics
Olympic gold medalists for Croatia in water polo
World Aquatics Championships medalists in water polo
Olympiacos Water Polo Club players
Croatian expatriate sportspeople in Greece
Croatian expatriate sportspeople in Italy
Expatriate water polo players